Duncan Wright (born 28 August 1940) is a former Australian rules footballer who played for Collingwood in the Victorian Football League (VFL) during the first part of the 1960s.

A half back flanker, Wright made his VFL debut mid year in 1960 after arriving at the club from Alphington.  He had to wait until 1963 to make another senior appearance and in 1964 was a member of Collingwood's losing grand final side.

Wright is best remembered for an incident in the opening quarter of the 1965 preliminary final when he knocked his opponent, John Somerville of Essendon, unconscious behind play. Somerville missed the following week's grand final which Essendon won while Wright never played in the VFL again after being sacked at preseason training in 1966. He instead moved to Canberra and became coach of Acton.

References

Holmesby, Russell and Main, Jim (2007). The Encyclopedia of AFL Footballers. 7th ed. Melbourne: Bas Publishing.

1940 births
Australian rules footballers from Victoria (Australia)
Collingwood Football Club players
Acton Football Club players
Living people
Duncan has two daughters. Fiona and Suzi.